Gustav von Paykull (21 August 1757 – 28 January 1826) was a Swedish friherre (circa baron) and Marshal of the Court, ornithologist, and entomologist.

He was a member of the Royal Swedish Academy from 1791 and a founder of the natural history museum (Naturhistoriska Riksmuseet) in Stockholm, through his 1819 donation of his extensive zoological collections to the academy (now in the Swedish Museum of Natural History). He was elected a member of the American Philosophical Society in 1801 and a Foreign Honorary Member of the American Academy of Arts and Sciences in 1804.

Publications
His best-known publications are:
Monographia Histeroidum. Upsaliae : Palmblad iv 114 pp. (1811).
Fauna Suecica. Insecta, Coleoptera. Upsala : Edman 3 volumes. (3 volumes, 1798, 1799, 1800)

Species named in his honor
 The red false black widow spider, Steatoda paykulliana
 The  pantropical jumping spider, Plexippus paykulli
 The band-bellied crake, Porzana paykullii
 Scolopax paykullii, probably the red breasted snipe, or short-billed dowitcher, now known as Scolopax grisea
  Tortrix paykulliana – synonym of Epinotia ramella
 Alucita paykullella – synonym of Micropterix paykullella 
 Amarygmus paykulii – Tenenbrionine beetle

References

External links

 Image of Paykull

1757 births
1826 deaths
Swedish nobility
Swedish entomologists
18th-century Swedish zoologists
19th-century Swedish zoologists
Fellows of the American Academy of Arts and Sciences
Members of the Royal Swedish Academy of Sciences